Caloptilia eurycryptis is a moth of the family Gracillariidae. It is known from the Andaman Islands.

References

eurycryptis
Moths described in 1928
Moths of Asia